Walter Downey Guilbert (February 11, 1844 – February 15, 1911) was a Republican politician in the U.S. State of Ohio who was Ohio State Auditor 1896–1909.

Guilbert was born at Guernsey County, Ohio. He studied in local schools, and at an academy in Wenona, Illinois. After leaving school, he remained in the Midwest until 1869. He then returned to Ohio and manufactured staves and engaged in salt making at South Olive, Noble County until 1881.

In 1881, Guilbert was elected auditor of Noble County, as a Republican, and re-elected in 1884.  In 1888 he was appointed chief clerk of the office of Auditor of State. In 1895 he was elected as Auditor of the State of Ohio, and continued in that office until 1909. He was an activist in his party, and a delegate to the Republican National Convention in 1888.

Guilbert married Mary L. Jordan of Noble County on February 2, 1868, and had three children. He was a Freemason, a Knight Templar, a member of the Mystic Shrine, the Independent Order of Odd Fellows, the K. of P., and the I.O.R.M. He died February 15, 1911, and is interred at Green Lawn Cemetery, Columbus, Ohio.

Notes

References

External links
 

Ohio lawyers
Ohio Republicans
People from Noble County, Ohio
People from Guernsey County, Ohio
1844 births
State Auditors of Ohio
1911 deaths
Burials at Green Lawn Cemetery (Columbus, Ohio)
Deaths from nephritis
19th-century American politicians
19th-century American lawyers